Anthim I (secular name Atanas Mihaylov Chalakov, ; 1816 – 1 December 1888) was a Bulgarian education figure and clergyman, and a participant in the Bulgarian liberation and church-independence movement. He was the first head of the Bulgarian Exarchate, a post he held from 1872 to 1877. He was also the first Chairman of the National Assembly of Bulgaria, presiding the Constituent Assembly and the 1st Grand National Assembly in 1879.

Anthim I was born in Kırk Kilise (Lozengrad) in Eastern Thrace (today Kırklareli, Turkey)  and became a monk in the Hilendar monastery on Mount Athos.

He studied in the Halki seminary (on the Princes' Islands near Constantinople), in Odessa as well as in Russia. He graduated from the Moscow Theological Academy (in Troitse-Sergiyeva Lavra) in 1856. He was ordained hieromonk by Metropolitan of Moscow Philaret Drozdov.

He was Archbishop of Preslav (from 1861) and then of Vidin (from 1868).

After he unilaterally declared an independent national church of the Bulgarians on May 11, 1872, he was defrocked by the Patriarchal Synod, under whose canonical jurisdiction he had been consecrated bishop. The condemnation was later affirmed at the Council in Constantinople in September the same year.

He died in Vidin in 1888 and his mausoleum can be found in the yard of the Vidin Archbishopric.

Honour
Antim Peak in Imeon Range on Smith Island in the South Shetland Islands, Antarctica is named for Antim I.

Notes 

1816 births
1888 deaths
Chairpersons of the National Assembly of Bulgaria
People from Kırklareli
Bishops of the Bulgarian Orthodox Church
Bulgarians from Eastern Thrace
Exarchs of Bulgaria
19th-century Eastern Orthodox priests
19th-century Bulgarian people
Theological School of Halki alumni
People associated with Hilandar Monastery